In enzymology, a 3-oxoadipyl-CoA thiolase is an enzyme that catalyzes the chemical reaction

succinyl-CoA + acetyl-CoA  CoA + 3-oxoadipyl-CoA

Thus, the two substrates of this enzyme are succinyl-CoA and acetyl-CoA, whereas its two products are CoA and 3-oxoadipyl-CoA.

This enzyme belongs to the family of transferases, specifically those acyltransferases transferring groups other than aminoacyl groups.  The systematic name of this enzyme class is succinyl-CoA:acetyl-CoA C-succinyltransferase. This enzyme participates in benzoate degradation via hydroxylation.

3-Oxoadipyl-CoA thiolase belongs to the thiolase family of enzymes.

References

 
 

EC 2.3.1
Enzymes of unknown structure